Austrocidaria callichlora is a species of moth of the family Geometridae. It endemic to New Zealand. It was first described by Arthur Gardiner Butler in 1879 and named Cidaria callichlora.

References

Xanthorhoini
Moths of New Zealand
Moths described in 1879
Endemic fauna of New Zealand
Taxa named by Arthur Gardiner Butler
Endemic moths of New Zealand